John Bennett Hill (May 31, 1893 in New York City, New York – December 9, 1977 in Los Angeles, California) was an American racecar driver active in the 1920s and 1930s. In 1922, he won a 100-mile race in Berkeley. He made 66 AAA Championship Car starts, capturing 5 wins and 7 poles.  He was particularly a specialist at board track racing where all his wins and poles came. He was credited with 3rd place in the 1923 and 1924 national championships and 4th place in 1926. He started eight times in the Indianapolis 500 and started 5th in 1924 driving a Miller.

Indy 500 Results

References

Sources
Rick Popely with L. Spencer Riggs, Indianapolis 500 Chronicle

1893 births
1977 deaths
Indianapolis 500 drivers
AAA Championship Car drivers
Racing drivers from New York City